Cayo Cruz del Padre is an uninhabited island on the northern coast of Cuba, in the province of Matanzas. It belongs to the Sabana section of the Sabana-Camagüey Archipelago.

References

Cruz del Padre
Geography of Matanzas Province